Lemyra biseriata is a moth of the family Erebidae. It was described by Frederic Moore in 1877. It is found in India (Assam, Khasi Hills) and Nepal.

References

biseriata
Moths described in 1877